The Gstanzl (Austro-Bavarian for Gestanzel, "stanza") is a traditional type of mocking songs particularly known in the Austrian-Bavarian regions. A Gstanzl normally consists of four lines, sometimes eight, and is sung in dialect. They can either be sung at certain dances (Ländler, Steirische), or are sung without dancing. 

Gstanzln (plural of Gstanzl) are normally only sung by men. The content of Gstanzln covers all areas of the life of simple people, normally of people from the countryside. The Gstanzln often have punch lines and are generally humorous. They are mocking authorities like the state, emperor, the land owners, the church or the peculiarities of other people and especially women.

At occasions, where multiple Gstanzln-singers meet and alternatingly sing a Gstanzl, they try to respond and outwit each other. Good Gstanzl-singers can go for hours without repeating themselves.

Depending on the region, a Gstanzl may also be called Schnadderhüpfl, Schanderhagge, Stückl, Possen-, Trutz- und Spitzliedln, Schleifer, Haarbrecher-Gsangln, Plopper- und Plepper(lieder), Schwatzliedln, Flausen and Schmetterliedln, G'setzln, Basseln, Vierzeilige, Kurschza Liadlan, Schelmeliedle, Chorze Liedle, Rappedietzle, Schlumperliedla or Rundâs.

The nature of Gstanzl is close to rapping.

Famous Gstanzl singers 
 Roider Jackl (17 June 1906 – 8 May 1975)

References 
 Ilka, Peter: Gaßlbrauch und Gaßlsprüch in Österreich; Verlag Alfred Winter, Neuauflage 1981
 Seiberl, Herbert, Palme, Johanna: Gstanzln aus dem Salzkammergut, 730 Vierzeiler: 1992  
 Hofer, Anton and Strohmayer, Wolfgang: Heut gemma nimmer hoam: im Auftrag der ARGE "Singen & Musizieren" im NÖ Bildungs- und Heimatwerk, Eigenverlag 
 Hrsg.: NÖ Heimatpflege: Lieder aus dem Mostviertel: Mödling 1993
 Wald, Hella, Jeglitsch, Helmut: Gstanzln für's Tanzln; Eigenverlag 1998 
 Falkner, Hans-Peter: 1234 Gstanzln & CD; Bibliothek der Provinz, 2. Auflage 1997

External links
 Ausseer Video: Landler - Clapping & Gstanzl-singing
 Video: Innviertler Landler - Krammerer Zeche (with eight-liner Gstanzln)
 Video: Waldhansl - Clapping & Gstanzl-singing
 Video: Waldhansl - Dance with Clapping & Gstanzl-singing

Song forms
Culture of Altbayern
Music in Bavaria
Austrian folk music
German-language literature
Austrian poetry
German poetry
Humorous poems